Dominic McDowall-Thomas is a game designer and publisher who has worked primarily on role-playing games and card games.

Career
Dominic McDowall-Thomas is a leadership and communications consultant. McDowall-Thomas began his relationship with Cubicle 7 on January 1, 2004. McDowall-Thomas and Angus Abranson were friends who regularly gamed and clubbed together, and he agreed to help edit the SLA Industries books for Abranson, starting with Hunter Sheets Issue One. In late 2006, Abranson and McDowall-Thomas properly formed Cubicle 7 Entertainment Limited, with the two of them as partners. Abranson and McDowall-Thomas handed the creation of Victoriana to Ian Sturrock and Andrew Peregrine, as they remained focus on the business side of things. When McDowall-Thomas was busy with a consultancy contract, Gareth-Michael Skarka stepped in to edit Starblazer Adventures (2008). After acquiring the Doctor Who license, Abranson and McDowall-Thomas needed investment by the end of 2008, and went to Matthew Sprange of Mongoose Publishing who introduced them to the Rebellion Group. Abranson and McDowall-Thomas were then able to go full-time for the first time in March 2009. When Cubicle 7 secured the license to Lord of the Rings, McDowall-Thomas and Robert Hyde of Sophisticted Games led the project, with lead designer Francesco Nepitello.

In November 2011 Abranson left Cubicle 7 after the reported failure of the print partnerships he oversaw. With McDowall-Thomas in sole charge of the company it went from financial crisis to turn over a million dollars within two years.

In 2012 the Mcdowall-penned "Words of the Wise" won the Silver ENnie award for best free product.

Under Mcdowall's CEOship, Cubicle 7 expanded beyond its original roleplaying games remit, into card games, and dice games.

In December 2014, Cubicle 7 announced that it had left the Rebellion Developments group of companies, following a successful management buy out led by CEO Dominic McDowall.

In July 2016, still under Mcdowall's sole leadership, Cubicle 7 announced "Adventures in Middle-earth" an OGL setting guide for Middle-earth, bringing Tolkien's work to the Dungeons & Dragons ruleset for the first time.

References

Living people
Place of birth missing (living people)
Role-playing game designers
Year of birth missing (living people)